Kalara International Properties, also known as Kalara, KalaraCo, and the Kalara Group, is a property development and resort services company in Thailand, based in Bophut on the island of Ko Samui. It also operates as a real estate agency covering Bangkok and other resorts areas in Thailand.

Kalara's development properties in Ko Samui and Phuket have won several national and international awards and commendations including architectural, design, interior design, and best development, with the company itself receiving awards for best developer and best agent.  These awards span from 2009 to 2012 and include the Southeast Asia Property Awards, the Thailand Property Awards, and the Asia Pacific Property Awards.

Founded in 2003 by owner and managing director Carl Lamb, Kalara's total annual sales in 2012 was 600 million Thai baht (USD $19 million), of which 350 million baht (USD $11.3 million) was accounted for by two of the company's projects on Ko Samui, CODE and Lanna.

Kalara also operates fleets of private jets and yachts and provides concierge services for properties it manages.  Kalara is a member of the Association of International Property Professionals (AIPP), which is based in London.

See also
List of companies of Thailand

References

External links
Kalara Group company website

Real estate companies of Thailand
Real estate services companies
Luxury real estate
Aircraft leasing companies
Surat Thani province
Real estate companies established in 2003
Thai companies established in 2003